The men's 1500m freestyle swimming event at the 2006 Asian Games was held on December 7, 2006, at the Hamad Aquatic Centre in Doha, Qatar. This was a timed-final event, meaning that each swimmer only swam once, with the fastest eight (8) entrants swimming in the finals.

Schedule
All times are Arabia Standard Time (UTC+03:00)

Records

Results
Legend
DNS — Did not start

References

Results

Swimming at the 2006 Asian Games